Salak Airport , is an airport serving Maroua, the capital of the Far North Region in Cameroon. It is also known as Maroua Airport or Maroua Salak Airport.

Airlines and Destinations

References

External links
 
 

Airports in Cameroon